Ta Sriratana (born 1939) is a Thai basketball player. He competed in the men's tournament at the 1956 Summer Olympics.

References

1939 births
Living people
Ta Sriratana
Ta Sriratana
Basketball players at the 1956 Summer Olympics
Place of birth missing (living people)